Fanfare is a compilation album by Scottish punk and new wave band Skids, released in 1982 via Virgin Records shortly after the group dissolved. John Peel wrote the album's liner notes.

Despite being a compilation, it doesn't contain any tracks from the band's fourth and final album Joy.

Critical reception
Trouser Press called Fanfare "an excellent compilation of singles and album tracks that serves as the perfect introduction to the Skids' magic."

Track listing

Side 1
"Into The Valley"
"Working For The Yankee Dollar" (live)
"Sweet Suburbia"
"A Woman in Winter"
"Masquerade" 
"The Saints Are Coming"

Side 2
"Animation"
"Out Of Town"
"T.V. Stars" (live)
"Of One Skin" (live)
"Charade"
"Circus Games"

References

External links
 Skids: Vinyl Albums

Skids (band) albums
1982 compilation albums
Virgin Records compilation albums
Albums with cover art by Russell Mills (artist)